Cheadle North railway station served the village of Cheadle, six miles south of Manchester.  It was renamed from Cheadle to Cheadle North on 1 July 1950.

Operating companies

The station was opened on 1 February 1866 by the Stockport, Timperley and Altrincham Junction Railway (ST&AJ). On 15 August 1867 the ST&AJ was merged into the Cheshire Lines Committee (CLC) joint railway.  The CLC survived intact at the 1923 UK railway grouping and continued to operate the station until the CLC was absorbed into the nationalised British Railways (BR) on 1 January 1948.  BR continued to operate the station for a further fourteen years until closure of the station, and others on the line, on 30 November 1964  as part of the Beeching Axe.

Location and station facilities

The station was located 0.5 miles north of Cheadle at the point where the Manchester Road passes over the line on a bridge.  The station was situated on the west side of the bridge, with the main buildings being on the south side of the line - these still survive in non-railway use. There was a small brick-built shelter for passengers on the north side of the line.  A goods shed and two-line siding was on the line's south side.

The station buildings were converted into a pub in the 1980s. The pub was initially named The Station when it was a Banks Brewery pub and later Chesters Brewery. It is now a free house called The Cheshire Line Tavern.  The line through the station (now reduced to single track) remains open for goods traffic.

Train services from the station

Cheadle CLC station was served by local passenger trains from Stockport Tiviot Dale to Altrincham and to Warrington Central and Liverpool Central stations. The weekday westbound passenger service during July 1922 consisted of four trains to Warrington and Liverpool and four trains to Altrincham. The October 1942 timetable showed the effect of wartime reductions, with three daily weekday passenger trains to Liverpool and one terminating at Glazebrook. In January 1956 the passenger train service remained sparse with just five trains in each direction, with none serving Altrincham.

Diagram showing railway lines in the Cheadle area

See also
Cheadle railway station (disambiguation)

References
Notes

Bibliography

External links

 Cheadle station on Disused Stations

Disused railway stations in the Metropolitan Borough of Stockport
Former Cheshire Lines Committee stations
Railway stations in Great Britain opened in 1866
Railway stations in Great Britain closed in 1964
1866 establishments in England
Beeching closures in England
Cheadle, Greater Manchester